Scott Morrison (born January 3, 1986), nicknamed "Scomo",  is a Canadian former professional basketball player who last played for Ryukyu Golden Kings of the B.League. Morrison played the center position.

College career
At the age of 18, he moved to America and  began his college career in Portland State University. He averaged 9.2 points and 5.6 rebounds for Vikings and still holds the school records for blocked shots and dunks, He was also a part of two Big Sky Conference champions team and was the conference's Defensive Player of the Year in 2007-08.

College statistics

|-
| style="text-align:left;"| 2004-05
| style="text-align:left;"| Portland State
|28  || 26 || 19.1 ||.588  ||.000 || .547 ||4.57 || 0.57 ||0.43  || 1.04|| 5.54
|-
| style="text-align:left;"| 2005-06
| style="text-align:left;"| Portland State
| 27 ||17  ||22.0  ||.455  || .000 ||.623 ||5.33  || 1.07 ||0.37  || 1.30 || 9.30
|-
| style="text-align:left;"| 2006-07
| style="text-align:left;"| Portland State
| 32 ||28  ||24.7  || .569 || .000 || .596||6.47  ||1.03  || 0.81 || 2.19 || 11.19
|-
| style="text-align:left;"| 2007-08
| style="text-align:left;"| Portland State
| 32 ||30  ||23.8  || .575 || .000 || .633|| 5.84 ||1.06  || 0.69 || 1.66 || 10.44
|-
|- class="sortbottom"
! style="text-align:center;" colspan=2|  Career 

!119 ||101 || 22.5||.543  || .000 ||.607  || 5.60 ||0.94  || 0.59 ||1.57  ||9.23
|-

NCAA Awards & Honors
All-Big Sky Second Team - 2008
Big Sky Defensive POY - 2008

Professional career
In 2008 Morrison signed with the Albacomp of Hungary, then subsequently spent seasons playing for teams in Canada, Estonia, Ukraine, Poland and Germany. In July 2013 he signed with the Melbourne Tigers for the 2013-14 season of the Australian NBL. He has often worn a black mask to protect his nose since having it broken twice in February 2014, in separate matches against the Perth Wildcats and Adelaide 36ers. In September 2014 he signed with the Aisin Seahorses Mikawa of the Japanese NBL. After spending one season with the Seahorses, Morrison was signed by the Akita Northern Happinets of the bj league, a rival league to the NBL, in August 2015. He signed for a second season with the Happinets in August 2016, who had joined the first division of the new B.League that was formed from the off-season merger of the NBL and bj league. Morrison suffered a broken cheek bone in October 2016 and subsequently started using a new mask.

Personal
Morrison was a Health Sciences major in Portland State. His father Alex and brother Steve also play basketball.

Career statistics

Regular season 

|-
|  style="background-color:#afe6ba" align="left" | 2009-10
| align="left" | Tartu
| 21 ||   || 21.7 || .607 || 1.000 || .620 || 6.8 || 1.1 || 0.7 || 0.9 ||  11.4
|-
|   align="left" | 2010-11
| align="left" | Politekhnika
| 32 ||   || 27.4 || .558 || .000 || .697 || 7.2 || 0.6 || 0.7 || 1.4 ||  13.3
|-
|   align="left" | 2010-11
| align="left" | Włocławek
| 6 ||   || 8.3 || .591 || .000 || .500 || 2.7 || 0.0 || 0.2 || 0.5 ||  4.8
|-
|   align="left" | 2011-12
| align="left" | Słupsk
| 38 || 37 || 22.6 || .619 || .000 || .634 || 5.71 || 0.53 || 0.47 || 1.26 ||  10.63
|-
|   align="left" | 2012-13
| align="left" | Bremerhaven
| 34 || 30 || 23.9 || .546 || .000 || .743 || 4.68 || 0.47 || 0.44 || 1.12 ||  10.35
|-
|   align="left" | 2013-14
| align="left" | Melbourne
| 31 || 25 || 26.4 || .589 || .000 || .717 || 6.81 || 0.55 || 0.52 || 1.29 ||  11.29
|-
|  style="background-color:#afe6ba" align="left" | 2014-15
| align="left" | Aisin
| 54 || 49 || 22.0 || 60.5 || - || 53.1 || 6.3 || 1.1 || 0.7 || 0.8 ||  8.7
|-
| align="left" | 2015-16
| align="left" | Akita
| 50 || 50 || 26.4 || 57.1 || 0.0 || 69.7 || 8.3 || 2.0 || 0.8 || 0.7 || 11.1
|-
| style="background-color:#FFCCCC" align="left" |  2016-17
| align="left" | Akita
| 58 || 53 || 21.7 || 52.9 || 0.0 || 65.5 || 5.7 || 0.9 || 0.6 || 0.5 ||  9.7
|-
| align="left" |  2017-18
| align="left" | San-en
| 59 || 29 || 21.9 || 58.0 || 0.0 || 54.5 || 5.9 || 0.9 || 0.4 || 0.3 ||  9.6
|-
|-
| align="left" |  2018-19
| align="left" | Kumamoto
| 7 || 7 || 31.3 || 50.9 || 0.0 || 52.8 || 7.7 || 1.4 || 0.4 || 0.9 ||  11.0
|-
| align="left" |  2018-19
| align="left" | Ryukyu
| 8 || 7 || 31.3 || 50.0 || 0.0 || 38.2 || 8.2 || 1.8 || 0.1 || 0.1 ||  6.6
|-

Playoffs 

|-
|style="text-align:left;"|2009-10
|style="text-align:left;"|Tartu
| 11 ||  || 24.9 || .590 || .000 || .773 || 6.2 || 1.3 || 0.6 || 1.7|| 12.0
|-
|style="text-align:left;"|2010-11
|style="text-align:left;"|Włocławek
| 4 ||  || 12.5 || .600 || .000 || .400|| 3.8 || 0.0 || 0.8 || 0.5|| 3.5
|-
|style="text-align:left;"|2011-12
|style="text-align:left;"|Słupsk
| 5 ||  || 22.2 || .742 || .000 || .692|| 6.0 || 1.0 || 0.6 || 1.6|| 11.0
|-
|style="text-align:left;"|2013-14
|style="text-align:left;"|Melbourne
| 3 ||  || 22.7 || .800 || .000 || .545|| 5.0 || 0.0 || 1.7 || 0.3|| 10.0
|-
|style="text-align:left;"|2014-15
|style="text-align:left;"|Mikawa
| 8 ||  || 16.6 || .630 || .000 || .543|| 4.0 || 0.6 || 0.5 || 0.5|| 5.4
|-
|style="text-align:left;"|2016-17
|style="text-align:left;"|Akita
| 3 || 3 || 18.16 || .647 || .000 || .778 || 4.7 || 0.0 || 0.6 || 0.6|| 9.7
|-

Early cup games 

|-
|style="text-align:left;"|2017
|style="text-align:left;"|San-en
| 2 || 2 || 28.12 || .476 || .000 || .500 || 10.0 || 2.5 || 0.5 || 0.5 || 12.5
|-

References

1986 births
Living people
Akita Northern Happinets players
Alba Fehérvár players
Basketball people from British Columbia
Canadian expatriate basketball people in Australia
Canadian expatriate basketball people in Germany
Canadian expatriate basketball people in Hungary
Canadian expatriate basketball people in Japan
Canadian expatriate basketball people in Poland
Canadian expatriate basketball people in the United States
Canadian men's basketball players
Centers (basketball)
Eisbären Bremerhaven players
KK Włocławek players
Kumamoto Volters players
Melbourne Tigers players
Portland State Vikings men's basketball players
Ryukyu Golden Kings players
San-en NeoPhoenix players
SeaHorses Mikawa players
Tartu Ülikool/Rock players
Expatriate basketball people in Estonia
Korvpalli Meistriliiga players